Kordali (also Romanized as Kordʿalī; also known as Kordlū) is a village in Hir Rural District, Hir District, Ardabil County, Ardabil Province, Iran. At the 2006 census, its population was 247, in 59 families.

References 

Towns and villages in Ardabil County